1995 ACC tournament may refer to:

 1995 ACC men's basketball tournament
 1995 ACC women's basketball tournament
 1995 ACC men's soccer tournament
 1995 ACC women's soccer tournament
 1995 Atlantic Coast Conference baseball tournament
 1995 Atlantic Coast Conference softball tournament